In economics and finance, market abuse may arise in circumstances where investors in a financial market have been unreasonably disadvantaged, directly or indirectly, by others who:
 have used information which is not publicly available (insider dealing)
 have distorted the price-setting mechanism of financial instruments
 have disseminated false or misleading information (market manipulation)

Market abuse is split into two different aspects (under EU definitions):
Insider dealing: where a person who has information not available to other investors (for example, a director with knowledge of a takeover bid) makes use of that information for personal gain
Market manipulation: where a person knowingly gives out false or misleading information (for instance, about a company's financial circumstances) in order to influence the price of a share for personal gain

In 2013/2014, the EU updated its legislation on market abuse, and harmonised criminal sanctions. In the 2015 Danish European Union opt-out referendum, the Danish population rejected adoption of the 2014 market abuse directive (2014/57/EU) and much other legislation.

In the UK, the market abuse directive (MAD) was implemented in 2003 to reduce market abuse. It applied to any financial instrument admitted to trading on a regulated market or in respect of which a request for admission to trading had been made. MAD was subsequently replaced by the Market Abuse Regulation (MAR) in 2016.

See also
 Anti-competitive practices
 Insider trading
 Financial Services and Markets Act 2000
 EU law
 ISO 37001 Anti-bribery management systems
 Group of States Against Corruption
 International Anti-Corruption Academy
 United Nations Convention against Corruption
 OECD Anti-Bribery Convention

References

Further reading
 

Abuse
Anti-competitive practices
Ethically disputed business practices
Corruption
Financial crimes
Insider trading
Stock market